Delyo Glacier is the 8 km long and 2.7 km wide glacier on the east side of the main crest of north-central Sentinel Range in Ellsworth Mountains, Antarctica.  It is situated northwest of Rumyana Glacier and south of Burdenis Glacier.  The glacier drains the north slopes of Mount Giovinetto and the east slopes of Mount Viets, flows northeastwards and together with Burdenis Glacier and Gerila Glacier joins upper Ellen Glacier north of Bruguière Peak.

The glacier is named after the Bulgarian rebel leader Delyo Voyvoda (17–18th century).

Location
US mapping in 1961 and 1988.

See also
 List of glaciers in the Antarctic
 Glaciology

Maps
 Vinson Massif.  Scale 1:250 000 topographic map.  Reston, Virginia: US Geological Survey, 1988.
 Antarctic Digital Database (ADD). Scale 1:250000 topographic map of Antarctica. Scientific Committee on Antarctic Research (SCAR). Since 1993, regularly updated.

References
 Delyo Glacier SCAR Composite Gazetteer of Antarctica
 Bulgarian Antarctic Gazetteer. Antarctic Place-names Commission. (details in Bulgarian, basic data in English)

External links
 Delyo Glacier. Copernix satellite image

Glaciers of Ellsworth Land
Bulgaria and the Antarctic